Bid Zard (also Romanized as Bīd Zard, Bīdzard, and Bid-i-Zard) is a village in Holayjan Rural District, in the Central District of Izeh County, Khuzestan Province, Iran. At the 2006 census, its population was 124, in 23 families.

References 

Populated places in Izeh County